Katherine Mathewson is a former candidate for political office in Ontario, Canada.  She was the leader of the Green Party of Ontario in the 1990 provincial election.

The Ontario Green Party was a very decentralized organization prior to 1993. Although Mathewson represented the Green Party in a cable forum involving minor party leaders, she does not otherwise seem to have played a prominent role in the provincial campaign.  There is no reference to her leadership on the party's official website.

Mathewson received 608 votes in the Toronto constituency of Don Mills, finishing fifth out of seven candidates.  The winner was Margery Ward of the Ontario New Democratic Party.

She has not run for provincial or federal political office since the 1990 election.

References

Green Party of Ontario candidates in Ontario provincial elections
Leaders of the Green Party of Ontario
Female Canadian political party leaders
Women in Ontario politics
Living people
Year of birth missing (living people)